Dosso may refer to:

Places in Niger
Dosso Region
Dosso (department)
Dosso, Niger, a town, capital of the Dosso département
Dosso Kingdom, the pre-colonial and modern ceremonial power in Dosso
Dosso meteorite of 1962, which fell in Dosso, Niger (see meteorite falls)

People
Dosso Dossi (c. 1490–1542), Italian High Renaissance painter
 Diego Daldosso (born 1983), Italian footballer
 Zaynab Dosso (born 1999); Italian sprinter

Court case in Pakistan 

 Dosso case